Maria Elisa Domingues, known as Maria Elisa (born June 4, 1950) is a Portuguese journalist and television presenter.

Early years
Maria Elisa was born in Lisbon, Portugal. After attending the Medical School of the University of Lisbon for two years and the Drama School for another two (1967–1972), she trained as a professional journalist at the Centre de Formation des Journalistes, in Paris (1974–1977).

Career
As a journalist with RTP, the Portuguese Public Television, she was the author and hostess of her own political and cultural talk shows since 1977. She received and interviewed most of the Presidents, Prime Ministers and other politicians, writers, painters and many other relevant cultural Portuguese personalities as well as business men and union leaders, among many others. She was the hostess of The Greatest Portuguese, a BBC format (October 2006 to March 2007).

In her life Maria Elisa Domingues had other professional experiences: she was the Press Counselor to Prime Minister Maria de Lourdes Pintasilgo (1979/1980); Program Director of RTP (1980–1983 and 1998–1999); Press Counselor with the Portuguese Embassy in Madrid (1986–1987); Director of Communication of the Calouste Gulbenkian Foundation (1995–1998) and Cultural Counselor with the Portuguese Embassy in London (2004–2006).
    
Maria Elisa nowadays is the President of Associação dos Jornalistas Europeus (the Portuguese association of European Journalists) and also a regular contributor to some of Portugal's largest newspapers and news magazines, such as Diário de Notícias, Público, Expresso and Visão.

Honours and decorations
She received the Ordem do Mérito from President Mário Soares in 1987.

Personal life
In January 2001, Maria Elisa was diagnosed with fibromyalgia. She is a member of Myos—Associação Nacional Contra a Fibromialgia e Síndrome de Fadiga Crónica (Fibromyalgia and Chronic Fatigue National Association).

References

1950 births
Living people
Portuguese women journalists
Portuguese television presenters
Lisbon Theatre and Film School alumni
University of Lisbon alumni
Portuguese women television presenters